BEJ48 (pronounced B.E.J. Sìshíbā, more often called B.E.J forty-eight) is a Chinese idol girl group based in Beijing. It is one of SNH48's sister groups formed in 2016, together with GNZ48.

Overview
BEJ48 is one of the first two sister groups of SNH48 formed. It has its theatre at the Youtang Life Square at the Chaoyang District in Beijing. Its name is an abbreviation of the pinyin name of "Beijing" (BEi Jing), "BEJ". Its first batch of members consist of some SNH48 fifth and sixth-generation members that are transferred.

As BEJ48 is formed under SNH48's management and not AKB48's managing company, AKS (SNH48 would later achieve independence from AKB48), the naming of its teams do not follow AKB48's conventions, and its initial two teams are named Team B and Team E.

History

2016
On April 20, 2016, Star48 announced the establishment of SNH48's two sister groups, BEJ48 and GNZ48. At the same time, it started holding auditions for first-generation members.

On April 29, the BEJ48 Theatre opened to public, with Team B holding the first performance of its 1st Stage, "Theater no Megami". On April 30, Team E help the first performance of its 1st Stage, "Pajama Drive".

On June 15, BEJ48 released their first fashion photobook, "Summer's Girl Garden" (初夏的少女花园). On July 19, they released their second fashion photobook, "Hot Party" (高温派对).

On September 5, they released their debut EP, The Awaking (元气觉醒).

On September 15, during Mid-Autumn Special Stage, it was announced that Duan Yixuan and Liu Shuxian were appointed Team B's captain and vice-captain respectively; Li Xiang and Liu Shengnan were appointed Team E's captain and vice-captain; SNH48 Team X's Yan Mingjun was transferred to Team B due to academic reasons.

On October 1, 20 first-generation members were announced, 16 of them whom were assigned to Team J.

On October 2, Team B began its 2nd Stage, "Heart Journey". On October 29, Team J began its 1st Stage, "Exclusive Party".

On November 1, auditions were held for SNH48 eighth-generation members, BEJ48 second-generation members, GNZ48 second-generation members and SHY48 second-generation members.

On December 24, Team E began its 2nd Stage, "Fantasy Coronation".

2017
On January 6, 2017, BEJ48 released their second EP, Smiling Sunflower (微笑的向日葵).

On March 4, Team B's Duan Yixuan and Team E's Li Zi were announced as the Annual Theater MVPs for the year 2016 respectively, as they were the members who received the highest number of votes within each team.

On April 1, they released their third EP, Manifesto (宣言).

On April 8, they held the "48 Idol Festival" special stage.

On April 14, Team B held the first performance of their Waiting Stage, "18 Shining Moments".

On April 20, BEJ48 announced 15 second-generation members during their first anniversary, meanwhile auditions were held for BEJ48, GNZ48 and SHY48 third-generation members.

On April 29, they released their first documentary, "The Best of Us" (BEJ48 最好的我们).

On July 29, BEJ48, along with SNH48, GNZ48, SHY48 and CKG48, held auditions for SNH48 ninth-generation, BEJ48, GNZ48 and SHY48 fourth-generation and CKG48 second-generation members.

On September 23, Team J held their waiting stage, "Because I Like You".

On September 30, BEJ48 released their fourth EP, Variety Exclamation Mark (百变惊叹号).

On October 6, Beijing STUDIO48-produced film Fairy Tale of Love (有言在仙), starring four BEJ48 members, Li Zi, Chen Qiannan, Li Xiang and Huang Enru, was released. The film is based on a book by Tu Jiezi.

On December 3, auditions were held for SNH48 tenth-generation members, BEJ48, GNZ48 and SHY48 fifth-generation members and CKG48 third-generation members.

On December 23, Zhang Huaijin was announced as Team J's captain, while Yang Ye was announced as its co-captain.

On December 24, SNH48 Group released their 18th EP, "Sweet Festival".

2018
On January 19, 2018, Team B debuted its stage, "B A Fighter".

On March 26, together with SNH48 Group, they released their sixth EP, Eyes On Me.

On April 20, BEJ48 held its first "Red vs White" Concert at the BEJ48 Theater, with Team Red emerging victorious. Meanwhile, auditions for sixth-generation members were held.

From April 27–30, BEJ48 held a streaming marathon challenge on Pocket 48 with GNZ48 where members for both groups take turns to record 48 livestream videos within 4 days.

On April 28, BEJ48's trainees debuted their stage, "Next Idol Project".

On April 30, Team E debuted its stage, "Universe".

On June 29, SNH48 Group's management, Star48, opened a global audition to recruit youths to be trained to become artists. This recruitment is for SNH48 Group members, Korean-style idol trainees and Fashion Mina China actors.

On July 14, Team J debuted its stage, "Hakuna Matata".

On September 7, members of BEJ48 and SHY48 attended the China (Beijing) Performing Arts Expo.

On November 8, two sixth-generation members were announced during the trainees' "Next Idol Project" stage.

2019
On January 3, 2019, sixth-generation member Xiong Yiyi was announced during the trainees' "Next Idol Project" stage, however netizens had pointed out that she had previously shot an indecent photo. The next day, officials issued a statement on the incident, denying that she had taken the relevant photos, and would take measures to safeguard the legal rights of the officials and members.

2020 
On September 4, 2020, SNH48 announced that due to the impacts of the COVID-19 pandemic and the months long closure of their Beijing theatre that teams B, E and J would all be disbanded. Most members from these teams were transferred to SNH48, and the ones who were left would no longer be split into teams, simply belonging to BEJ48.

As of now, BEJ48 came back and is currently active sister group of SNH48 again.

Members

, according to the official website.

BEJ48

Members on hiatus

Former members

Graduated members

Transferred members

Former trainees 
 Li Hailin (November 30 in Sichuan) transferred to IDOLS Ft on January 19, 2019
 Li Qingyu ( in Guizhou) transferred to IDOLS Ft on January 19, 2019
 Xiong Yiyi (October 5 in Hubei) transferred to IDOLS Ft on January 19, 2019, unofficially resigned on January 4, 2019
 Yang Yuxin ( in Henan) transferred to IDOLS Ft on January 19, 2019
 Zhang Yuqian (April 3 in Enshi, Hubei) transferred to IDOLS Ft on January 19, 2019

Discography

EPs
 1st EP: "The Awaking" (Chinese: 元气觉醒) - Released on September 6, 2016
 2nd EP: "Smiling Sunflower" (Chinese: 微笑的向日葵) - Released on January 6, 2017
 3rd EP: "Manifesto" (Chinese: 宣言) - Released on April 1, 2017
 4th EP: "Variety Exclamation Mark" (Chinese: 百变惊叹号) - Released on September 29, 2017
 5th EP: "Once Upon the Light of Dawn" (Chinese: 晨曦下的我们) - Released on March 27, 2019

Concerts

Notes

References

External links 
  

2016 establishments in China
Chinese girl groups
Chinese pop music groups
Musical groups established in 2016
Musical groups from Beijing
SNH48 Group